The Eurovision Young Dancers 1991 was the fourth edition of the Eurovision Young Dancers, held at the Helsinki City Theatre in Helsinki, Finland on 5 June 1991. Organised by the European Broadcasting Union (EBU) and host broadcaster Yleisradio (YLE), dancers from eight countries participated in the televised final. A total of fifteen countries took part in the competition.  made their début (making this the first Eurovision event to feature a former Warsaw Pact country ahead of the 1994 Eurovision Song Contest), while ,  and  withdrew from the contest. However, the Austrian broadcaster ÖRF and the Canadian CBC broadcast the event.

Each country could send one or two dancers, male or female, who could perform one or two dances.

Amaya Iglesias of Spain won the contest, with France and Denmark placing second and third respectively.

Location

Helsinki City Theatre, was the host venue for the 1991 edition of the Eurovision Young Dancers.

Format
The format consists of dancers who are non-professional and between the ages of 16–21, competing in a performance of dance routines of their choice, which they have prepared in advance of the competition. All of the acts then take part in a choreographed group dance during 'Young Dancers Week'.

Jury members of a professional aspect and representing the elements of ballet, contemporary, and modern dancing styles, score each of the competing individual and group dance routines. The overall winner upon completion of the final dances is chosen by the professional jury members.

During the interval a documentary by Finnish journalist  about the early stages of the competition and the dancers who did not reach the final was broadcast.

Results

Preliminary round
A total of fifteen countries took part in the preliminary round of the 1991 contest, of which eight qualified to the televised grand final. The following countries failed to qualify.

Final
Awards were given to the top three countries. The table below highlights these using gold, silver, and bronze. The placing results of the remaining participants is unknown and never made public by the European Broadcasting Union.

Jury members 
The jury members consisted of the following:

  – Jorma Uotinen (Head of Jury)
  – Josette Amiel
  – Frank Andersen
 / – Gigi Gheorghe Caciuleanu
  – Peter Van Dyk
  – André-Philippe Hersin
  – Heinz Spoerli
  – Gösta Svalberg
  – Víctor Ullate

Broadcasting
The 1991 Young Dancers competition was broadcast in 17 countries including Austria and Canada.

See also
 Eurovision Song Contest 1991

References

External links 
 

Eurovision Young Dancers by year
1991 in Finland
June 1991 events in Europe
Events in Helsinki